4-Hydroxy-3-methoxymethamphetamine (HMMA) is an active metabolite of 3,4-methylenedioxymethamphetamine (MDMA). It is a slightly more potent stimulant than MDMA.

References

Methamphetamines
Human drug metabolites